Gina Bellman (born 1966) is a New Zealand-born British actress best known for her performances as grifter Sophie Devereaux on the 2008-12 TNT television series Leverage and in the revival Leverage: Redemption when the series moved to Amazon Freevee in 2021 and Jane Christie on the 2000–04 BBC hit comedy show Coupling.

Early life
Bellman was born in Auckland, New Zealand, to Jewish parents of Russian and Polish descent who emigrated to New Zealand from England in the 1950s. Her family returned to the United Kingdom when she was 11 years old. She was educated at Rosh Pinah Primary School and JFS in London.

Career
After making her debut in an episode of Into the Labyrinth in 1982, and a two-episode stint in Grange Hill in 1984, she became a household name for her performance in the title role in Dennis Potter's drama Blackeyes. She is also well known for playing Jane in the sitcom
Coupling. Her other TV roles include Waking the Dead, Jonathan Creek, Little Napoleons, and one-off appearances in Only Fools and Horses and Hotel Babylon.

She has also appeared in several feature films including King David (1985), which starred Richard Gere and Edward Woodward, Secret Friends (1991), Leon the Pig Farmer (1992), and Silent Trigger (1996) opposite Dolph Lundgren.

She co-starred alongside James Nesbitt in the 2007 BBC One drama serial Jekyll, a modern-day sequel to Robert Louis Stevenson's Strange Case of Dr Jekyll and Mr Hyde, written by Coupling author Steven Moffat.

In 2008, she began appearing on the TNT channel's serial drama Leverage, starring Timothy Hutton, for which she was nominated for a Saturn Award for Best Supporting Actress in Television, but lost to Lucy Lawless.

In 2013, Bellman narrated poetry for The Love Book App, an interactive anthology of love literature developed by Allie Byrne Esiri. In late 2013, she played the role of "The Italian Woman" in the National Theatre's production of the Georg Kaiser play From Morning to Midnight.

In 2015, Bellman appeared as Vivien Leigh in the European premiere of the Austin Pendleton play Orson's Shadow, at the Southwark Playhouse in London.

In 2021, Bellman reprised the role of Sophie Deveraux in Leverage: Redemption, a revival of Leverage.

Personal life
From 2005 to 2007, Bellman was married to Lucho Brieva.

In 2009, she had a daughter, Romy, with Zaab Sethna, whom she met just after shooting the Leverage pilot. She and Sethna married in 2013.

Filmography

References

External links

Living people
People from Auckland
People educated at JFS (school)
British film actresses
British Jews
British people of Polish-Jewish descent
British people of Russian-Jewish descent
British television actresses
Jewish British actresses
New Zealand emigrants to England
New Zealand Jews
New Zealand people of Polish-Jewish descent
New Zealand people of Russian-Jewish descent
20th-century British actresses
21st-century British actresses
New Zealand expatriates in England
1966 births